Clathurella colombi is a species of sea snail, a marine gastropod mollusk in the family Clathurellidae.

Original description
 Stahlschmidt P., Poppe G.T. & Tagaro S.P. (2018). Descriptions of remarkable new turrid species from the Philippines. Visaya. 5(1): 5-64. page(s): 7, pl. 2 figs 1-3.

References

External links
 Worms Link

colombi
Gastropods described in 2018